The German name Michelsdorf can refer to:
 Ciceu-Mihăiești in Romania
 Michelsdorf, a district of Cham, Germany
 Miszkowice, Kamienna Góra County, Lower Silesian Voivodeship, in south-western Poland
 Michałkowa, Wałbrzych County, Lower Silesian Voivodeship, in south-western Poland
 Michalice, Namysłów County, Opole Voivodeship, in south-western Poland
 Veliká Ves (Chomutov District) in Czech Republic